Håkan Arvidsson (born 14 April 1953) is a former Swedish football player.

During his club career, Arvidsson played for Östers IF, Vederslöv/Dännigelanda IF and Kalmar FF.

Arvidsson made 17 appearances for the Sweden national football team, between 1976 and 1980.

References

External links

1953 births
Swedish footballers
Sweden international footballers
Östers IF players
Kalmar FF players
Association football defenders
Living people
Sportspeople from Jönköping